Ceracris kiangsu is a species of grasshoppers in the subfamily Oedipodinae, sometimes called the yellow-spined bamboo locust. It occurs in Indo-China and southern China, where it may become a locally significant agricultural pest. No subspecies are listed in the Catalogue of Life.

Mud-puddling behaviour has been noted: these insects are attracted to the sodium and ammonium ions in human urine.

References

External links
 Pictures (Thailand) farangsgonewild.com
 Pictures (Thailand) komchadluek.net
 

Caelifera
Orthoptera of Indo-China
Insects of China
Insects described in 1929